Asiatic Warriors, originally named Cold-N-Loco, were a multilingual hardcore rap crew from Frankfurt, Germany.

Cold-N-Loco was composed of D-Flame (Daniel Kretschmer), A-Bomb and Combad. They invited the Kurdish hip hop artist Azad to join the band and it was renamed Asian Warriors. It delivered a mix of German, English, and Turkish lyrics along with hard beats.

After the split, D-Flame and Azad went on for solo careers.

Discography
 1994: Told Ya (Dragnet/Sony)
 1997: Strength (We don't play records/EFA)

References

External links
Azad Official website
D-Flame Official website
D-Flame MySpace website

German musical groups